Sapphire Lake can refer to the following lakes in the United States:

Sapphire Lake (Fresno County, California), near Mount Fiske
Sapphire Lake (Trinity County, California)
Sapphire Lake (Colorado) in El Paso County
Sapphire Lake (Florida) in Hillsborough County
Sapphire Lake (Idaho) in Custer County
 A lake in Lake Township, Missaukee County, Michigan
Sapphire Lake (Minnesota) in Lake County
Sapphire Lake (Montana), a lake of in Missoula County, Montana
Sapphire Lake (North Carolina) in Jackson County
Sapphire Lake (Oregon) in Lane County
Sapphire Lake (Johnson County, Wyoming)
Sapphire Lake (Sublette County, Wyoming)

See also
 Lake Sapphire (disambiguation)

References